The South Atlantic Invasive Species Project is a three-year project (December 2006 - December 2009) funded under the European Union EDF 9. The purpose of the project is to increase the capacity of the UK's South Atlantic Overseas Territories to deal with invasive species issues. The territories involved are Saint Helena, Tristan da Cunha, South Georgia and the South Sandwich Islands, the Falkland Islands and Ascension Island. The project is managed by the Royal Society for the Protection of Birds (RSPB) on behalf of the partner governments. In addition to the partner governments, two NGOs: Falklands Conservation and the Saint Helena National Trust are key stakeholders.

Project progress
The project started with the appointment of two project officers, Andrew Darlow, for Saint Helena, Ascension and Tristan da Cunha, and Brian Summers for the Falkland Islands, South Georgia and South Sandwich Islands.

During the course of the project, Dr Phil Lambdon discovered a living example of a type of sedge on Saint Helena, Bulbostylis neglecta, that had not been seen for over 200 years and was previously feared extinct.

Clare Miller who manages the South Atlantic Invasive Species project said:

Saint Helena’s wildlife has been ravaged by species introduced to the island. Goats, gorse, grasses, and cage birds have all been liberated on the island where they have wreaked havoc with the native species. Saint Helena is a noted extinction hotspot, driven largely by non-native species, and the native birds have suffered more here than many other islands. Of eight species of bird confined to the island, seven have become extinct since the island’s discovery in 1502.

References

Invasive species